Public Morals is an American police drama television series, created, written, executive-produced and directed by Edward Burns. Set in New York City during the 1960s, the show focuses on the Public Morals Division of the New York City Police Department and its officers' attempts to deal with vice in the city, while managing their personal lives as Irish Americans. The series aired from August 25 to October 20, 2015, on TNT. The network collaborated with Amblin Television, Steven Spielberg, Justin Falvey, Darryl Frank, and Aaron Lubin as producers. On December 15, 2015, TNT canceled the series after one season.<ref>{{cite web|url=https://deadline.com/2015/12/public-morals-legends-agent-x-canceled-tnt-1201667681/|title='Public Morals', 'Legends & Agent X Canceled By TNT|last=Andreeva|first=Nellie|date=December 15, 2015|work=Deadline|access-date=December 15, 2015}}</ref>

Cast and characters
Edward Burns as Officer Terry Muldoon
Michael Rapaport as Officer Charlie Bullman, Terry's partner
Elizabeth Masucci as Christine Muldoon, Terry's wife
Katrina Bowden as Fortune
Ruben Santiago-Hudson as Lt. King
Wass Stevens as Officer Vince Latucci
Keith Nobbs as Pat Duffy
Austin Stowell as Officer Sean O'Bannon
Patrick Murney as Officer Petey "Mac" MacGuinness
Lyndon Smith as Deirdre
Brian Wiles as Officer Jimmy Shea
Cormac Cullinane as James Muldoon

Recurring
Neal McDonough as Rusty Patton
Brian Dennehy as Joe Patton
Timothy Hutton as Mr. O'Bannon
Anita Gillette as Eileen
Robert Knepper as Capt. Johanson
Fredric Lehne as Tommy Red
Kevin Corrigan as Smitty
Peter Gerety as Sgt. Mike Muldoon
Aaron Dean Eisenberg as Richie Kane
Ray Wiederhold as Monk
Corey Cott as Ryan
Audrey Esparza as Theresa

Episodes

Production
Creator Edward Burns began working on film scripts about Irish-American New York City police officers and Irish-American gangsters when executive producer Steven Spielberg suggested he write a script about his father's experience on the NYPD, while on the set of Saving Private Ryan. Though Public Morals did not draw from those scripts, Burns' research for them helped establish a foundation for the television series. In May 2015, TNT placed a 10-episode order for the series. While producing the series, Burns incorporated references to some of his favorite police and gangster films, including references to The Hustler, The Godfather, The French Connection, and Mean Streets, among other films.

Release
The series premiered on TNT on August 25, 2015. All other episodes were released on demand before they were broadcast on TV: episodes 2–4 on August 26, and the remaining episodes on September 5, 2015.

ReceptionPublic Morals received generally positive reviews from critics. On Rotten Tomatoes the series holds an approval rating of 82% based on 28 reviews, with an average rating of 7.06/10. The site's critical consensus reads: "Public Morals'' is a worthy mob crime drama, with a strong leading man and a talented supporting cast counterbalancing cliché-ridden dialogue." On Metacritic, the series has a score of 69 out of 100, based on 22 critics, indicating "generally favorable reviews".

References

External links
 
 

2015 American television series debuts
2015 American television series endings
2010s American crime drama television series
2010s American police procedural television series
English-language television shows
Fictional portrayals of the New York City Police Department
Television shows set in New York City
Television series set in the 1960s
Television series by Amblin Entertainment
Television series by Warner Bros. Television Studios
TNT (American TV network) original programming
Works about Irish-American organized crime